The 7th Central Committee of the Communist Party of Cuba (CPC) was elected at the 7th CPC Congress in 2016. It was composed of 142 members of which 44.37% were women and 35.92% of members were black or mixed race.

Members

References

7th Central Committee of the Communist Party of Cuba
2016 establishments in Cuba
2021 disestablishments in Cuba